Phenacogrammus deheyni is a species of fish in the African tetra family. It is found in the middle Congo River, the Ruki drainage, of the Mongala and Aruwimi rivers in the Democratic Republic of the Congo, Africa.

Etymology
The tetra is named in honor of diplomat/naturalist Jean Jacques Deheyn (b. 1914), of the Royal Museum of Central Africa, who collected the type specimen.

References

Paugy, D., 1984. Characidae. p. 140-183. In J. Daget, J.-P. Gosse and D.F.E. Thys van den Audenaerde (eds.) Check-list of the freshwater fishes of Africa (CLOFFA). ORSTOM, Paris and MRAC, Tervuren. Vol. 1. 

Alestidae
Freshwater fish of Africa
Taxa named by Max Poll
Fish described in 1945